= The Black Hole (video game) =

1982 video game

- Developer: Yves Lempereur
- Publishers: Funsoft, Inc.
- Platform: TRS-80
- Release: 1982
- Genre: Shoot 'em up
- Mode: Single-player

The Black Hole is a 1982 video game published by Funsoft.

== Gameplay ==
The Black Hole is a game in which the player first flies a ship through a long tunnel avoiding projectiles, before coming to a wall protecting a creature, and in the third phase the player attacks the mothership.

== Reception ==
Dick McGrath reviewed the game for Computer Gaming World, and stated that "Black Hole is just an average arcade game but considering the variation provided by the three separate phases I would rate it a 6.5 out of 10."
